Theodore Palaiologos or Palaeologus, can refer to:

 Theodore Palaiologos (son of Michael VIII) (c. 1263 – after 1310), Byzantine prince and general
 Theodore I, Marquess of Montferrat (c. 1291–1338), Marquess of Montferrat in 1306–1338
 Theodore I Palaiologos  (c. 1355–1407), Despot of the Morea in 1383–1407
 Theodore II, Marquess of Montferrat (died 1418), Marquess of Montferrat in 1381–1418
 Theodore II Palaiologos (c. 1396–1448), Despot of the Morea in 1407–1443
 Teodoro Paleologo di Montferrato (1425–1484), Catholic bishop
 Theodore Palaiologos (stratiote) (1452–1532), stratiote in the service of Venice
Theodore Paleologus (c. 1560–1636), alleged descendant of Thomas Palaiologos
Theodore Paleologus (Junior) (1609–1644), son of Theodore Paleologus
Theodorious Paleologus (c. 1660–1693), grandson of Theodore Paleologus
Theodore Palaeologo (pretender) (c. 1823–1912), 19th-century pretender to the throne of Greece

See also
Theodore Kantakouzenos (d. 1410), Theodore Palaiologos Kantakouzenos